Sokotosuchus is an extinct genus of dyrosaurid crocodyliform which existed during the Maastrichtian in western Africa. Fossils of the genus were found in the Dukamaje Formation of Nigeria, and some cranial material has possibly been found in Mali.

References

Bibliography

Further reading 
 L. B. Halstead. 1975. Sokotosuchus ianwilsoni n. g., g. sp., a new teleosaur crocodile from the Upper Cretaceous of Nigeria. Journal of Mining and Geology 11(1-2):101-103

Dyrosaurids
Prehistoric pseudosuchian genera
Prehistoric marine crocodylomorphs
Maastrichtian genera
Late Cretaceous crocodylomorphs of Africa
Cretaceous Nigeria
Fossils of Nigeria
Fossil taxa described in 1975

Fossils of Mali